Southern Highlands was an electoral district of the Legislative Assembly in the Australian state of New South Wales from 1988 to 2007, named after the Southern Highlands. It was replaced by a recreated Goulburn electorate.

Members for Southern Highlands

Election results

References

Former electoral districts of New South Wales
1988 establishments in Australia
Constituencies established in 1988
Constituencies disestablished in 2007
2007 disestablishments in Australia